Karji (also Romanized as Kārjī) is a village in Binalud Rural District, in the Central District of Nishapur County, Razavi Khorasan Province, Iran. At the 2006 census, its population was 111, in 25 families.

See also 
 Karji (Indian village)
 Karji, Firuzeh

References 

Populated places in Nishapur County